Jack Rowan (born 18 February 1997) is an English actor, nominated for best actor at the BAFTAs for his performance in Born to Kill (2017). Rowan has appeared  in Peaky Blinders, Casualty, Silent Witness, and Beowulf: Return to the Shieldlands. In 2020, he played Callum McGregor in the BBC drama series Noughts + Crosses.

Early life
Rowan was born 18 February 1997 in Pimlico, Westminster, London. Before becoming an actor, Rowan was an amateur boxer from age 12, winning 18 of 27 fights.

Career
Known for his roles as Sam in Born to Kill and Bonnie in Peaky Blinders. He has also had small roles in numerous television dramas including Casualty, Silent Witness, and Beowulf: Return to the Shieldlands. In 2020, he played Callum McGregor in the BBC drama series Noughts + Crosses. 

In 2022, Rowan joined the cast of the upcoming television series A Town Called Malice, where he plays protagonist Gene Lord in a cast which includes Jason Flemyng, Dougray Scott and Tahirah Sharif.

Filmography

Awards and nominations

References

External links

21st-century British actors
English male film actors
English male television actors
Living people
Male actors from London
People from Pimlico
1997 births